Frank Scalercio (born January 3, 1960) is an American college football coach, who served as the head coach of the Sonoma State Cossacks from 1993 to 1996. During this time he compiled an overall record of 7–30–1 with future NFL All-Pro guard Larry Allen being his most notable player. Scalercio was relieved of his position in December 1996 when the university president Reuben Arminana decided to discontinue the football program in part after students rejected a $300 fee increase to help in covering its operating costs.

Head coaching record

References

1960 births
Living people
Sonoma State Cossacks football coaches
UC Davis Aggies football players